Diganibougou or Diganidougou is a rural commune in the Cercle of Ségou in the Ségou Region of Mali. The commune lies to the north of the Niger River opposite the urban commune of Ségou and includes 22 villages in an area of approximately 571 square kilometers. In the 2009 census the commune had a population of 13,879. The administrative center (chef-lieu) is the village of Digani.

References

External links
.
.

Communes of Ségou Region